The 1977 National Invitation Tournament was the 1977 edition of the annual NCAA college basketball competition.

Selected teams
Below is a list of the 16 teams selected for the tournament. This was the first edition of the tournament in which early round games were played at campus sites.

 Alabama
 Creighton
 Georgetown
 Houston
 Illinois State
 Indiana State
 Massachusetts
 Memphis State
 Old Dominion
 Oral Roberts
 Oregon
 Rutgers
 St. Bonaventure
 Seton Hall
 Villanova
 Virginia Tech

Bracket
Below is the tournament bracket.

See also
 1977 NCAA Division I basketball tournament
 1977 NCAA Division II basketball tournament
 1977 NCAA Division III basketball tournament
 1977 NAIA Division I men's basketball tournament
 1977 National Women's Invitational Tournament

References

National Invitation
National Invitation Tournament
1970s in Manhattan
Basketball in New York City
College sports in New York City
Madison Square Garden
National Invitation Tournament
National Invitation Tournament
Sports competitions in New York City
Sports in Manhattan